Korreh may refer to:

 Kareh-ye Mian Rud-e Zaruni
 Korehi